Slocumb is an English surname. Notable people with the surname include:

Heathcliff Slocumb (born 1966), American baseball player
Jesse Slocumb (1780–1820), U.S. Congressional Representative
William Slocumb (1810–1865), Canadian physician and politician

See also
Slocombe (disambiguation)
Slocum (disambiguation)

English-language surnames